The Democratic Party (Spanish: Partido Demócrata) was a political party in Cuba. They won 21 out of 57 seats in the Cuban parliamentary election in 1942.

References 

Defunct political parties in Cuba
Political parties established in 1942
Political parties disestablished in 1962
1962 disestablishments in Cuba
1942 establishments in Cuba